Steve Baxter is an Australian investor and entrepreneur. He was one of the 'sharks' on the Australian television series Shark Tank.

Early life
Steve Baxter was born in the remote town of Cloncurry, Australia, and raised in Emerald in Queensland's Central Highlands Region. He moved to Rockhampton and attended North Rockhampton State High School. He left school at 15 and joined the army, enlisting in its apprenticeship program. There, he became an engineer working in the field of electronics, telecoms and guided weapon systems.

Career
Baxter's career in the Australian Army spanned nine years from 1986 to 1995. In 1994, at the age of 23, Baxter put his life savings of $11,000 on the line to launch his first start-up, an internet service provider, SE Net from the spare room of his Adelaide home. Servicing more than 35,000 customers, SE Net was eventually acquired by OzEmail/UUNet under the stewardship of its founding Director and future Australian Prime Minister, Malcolm Turnbull.

In 2001, Baxter teamed with schoolmate and Australian technology entrepreneur Bevan Slattery to launch his second start-up, PIPE Networks. On 30 June 2008, Baxter resigned as Chief Technology Officer of PIPE Networks and moved to California to work with Google as a Technical Program Manager leading a project to deliver high-speed telecommunications systems across North America. Baxter remained a non-executive director of PIPE Networks until it was later sold to TPG in April 2010.

In March 2012, Baxter launched River City Labs in Brisbane, a leading co-working community to encourage entrepreneurs in Queensland. In 2013, he co-founded Right Pedal Studios, a mobile gaming accelerator, and StartupAUS an advocacy group for Australian tech startups.

In October 2014, Baxter became a major early-stage investor in Australian start-ups, helping to launch a host of companies which together boast a valuation of more than $100 million.

In 2014 and 2015, Baxter funded the Startup Catalyst program, in which 20 young Queenslanders with potential to be the next globally successful tech entrepreneurs, are sent to San Francisco to be immersed in the startup and entrepreneurial culture. Says Baxter of the program, "I love the term 'startup ebola.' It speaks to the contagious nature of what we are trying to do. We want the 20 young people we took this year to infect another 20 each on their return."

In November 2014, Baxter was announced as one of the "sharks" on Network Ten's Shark Tank. The series premiered in February 2015.

In October 2017, Baxter became Queensland's chief entrepreneur, replacing Mark Sowerby.

Personal life
Baxter has three daughters with his wife Emily. He has recently been involved in anti-climate change, anti-vaccination, and anti-LGBT movements in Brisbane Australia.

References

Living people
Australian company founders
Australian investors
Participants in Australian reality television series
People from Cloncurry, Queensland
People from Central Queensland
1971 births